Frestonia is the sixth and final studio album by the Scottish band Aztec Camera, released in 1995. Roddy Frame's subsequent releases would be under his own name. The title of the album refers to the community of Frestonia, in the Notting Hill district of London.

Frestonia was the lowest-charting Aztec Camera album in the United Kingdom, reaching No. 100, whereas all previous releases made the top 30. "Sun", the only single, failed to chart.

Critical reception

The Independent determined that "apart from one or two highlights ... it's pretty dull fare, with desultory, predictable arrangements doing their best to avoid trampling over the lyrics." The Record deemed the album "a repulsive bit of narcissism that can't even make a claim for tragic portent; instead, it just sounds like the work of a poser."

In 2021, Pitchfork wrote: "Less musically adventurous than its predecessor, Aztec’s 1995 album Frestonia is strongest in its softest moments, trading the sonic ambition of Dreamland for a classic approach to solo songwriting."

Track listing 
All tracks written by Roddy Frame.
 "Rainy Season" 5:41
 "Sun" 4:28
 "Crazy" 5:19
 "On the Avenue" 3:43
 "Imperfectly" 4:22
 "Debutante" 7:10
 "Beautiful Girl" 4:50
 "Phenomenal World" 4:09
 "Method of Love" 4:23
 "Sunset" 4:21

Personnel 
Roddy Frame – guitar, vocals
Yolanda Charles – bass, background vocals
Mark Edwards – keyboards
Jeremy Stacey – drums
Luís Jardim – percussion
Claudia Fontaine – background vocals
Audrey Riley, Chris Tombling, Leo Payne, Sue Dench – strings

References

Aztec Camera albums
1995 albums
Albums produced by Clive Langer
Albums produced by Alan Winstanley
Reprise Records albums